The  Galatas Palace is a Minoan site on Crete  discovered in the early 1990s. Built on a much older settlement, the “palace” was constructed in the early Neopalatial Period, sometime after 1700 B.C.E. (MMIIIB) The palatial center was destroyed by an earthquake and abandoned later in the postpalatial period, or around 1500 B.C.E.(LMIB)

The east wing is the best-preserved part of the structure, while the West and South wings were found to be extensively damaged. Excavations have not been completed in the area of the North wing of the building. The archaeological site is considered to be unique because it is the only such Minoan center to have been built and inhabited during one period. The excavator, Dr. Giorgos Rethemiotakis refers to the site as a Minoan palace, but the use of the term “palace” is still ambiguous since all of the monumental Minoan sites have clear religious implications suggesting the sites were "temples" instead.

Archaeology 
Galatas was discovered in 1992 when illegal excavations revealed the existence of several buildings associated with the Minoans. The site, located at Galatas Kephala, some 30 km south of Heraklion, and near the modern village of Galatas, was excavated under the guidance of archaeologist Dr. George Rethemiotakis. By 1997, he announced that a new Minoan palace had been discovered.

Rethemiotakis and his team unearthed a large, paved central courtyard oriented north and south, that measured 16 meters by 32 meters. This is a typical feature of other Crete palatial sites (i. e., Knossos, Phaistos, Malia, and Zakros). They found remnants of a four-wing building that once surrounded the central court, also reminiscent of other Minoan palatial sites. Another unique feature of this Minoan center was a huge hearth measuring 3 meters by 1.5 meters, the first discovered on Crete. Two other hearths intended for feasting were also discovered, along with numerous Minoan ceramic finds, indicating large feasting events. The archaeologists discovered only scant remains of much of the west and south wings of the building. The east wing is the best-preserved section, while the north wing and the surrounding town still remain to be excavated.

References

Minoan sites in Crete
Aegean palaces of the Bronze Age